Goodbye Again is a 1933 pre-Code romantic comedy film made by First National Pictures and Warner Bros.

It was directed by Michael Curtiz and produced by Henry Blanke from a screenplay by Ben Markson, based on the play by George Haight and Allan Scott. Cinematography was by George Barnes and costume design by Orry-Kelly.

The film stars Warren William, Joan Blondell, Genevieve Tobin, Hugh Herbert, Wallace Ford, Helen Chandler, Hobart Cavanaugh, and Ruth Donnelly.

Remade in 1941 as Honeymoon for Three, starring Ann Sheridan and George Brent.

Plot
On tour in Cleveland, famous author Kenneth Bixby (Warren William) decides to reignite a romance with ex-sweetheart Julie (Genevieve Tobin), skipping a downtown engagement at Halle's.  However, Julie's family, her husband Harvey (Hugh Herbert), and Bixby's loyal secretary Anne (Joan Blondell), who has been carrying a torch for her boss for years, would prefer that Bixby stick to writing and stay away from Julie.

Cast

References

External links
 
 
 
 

Films directed by Michael Curtiz
1933 films
First National Pictures films
1930s English-language films
American black-and-white films
American films based on plays
1933 romantic comedy films
American romantic comedy films
Films set in Cleveland
1930s American films